Route 133 is a state highway in western Connecticut, running from U.S. Route 202 in Brookfield to Route 67 in Bridgewater.

Route description

Route 133 begins as Junction Road at an intersection with US 202 in western Brookfield. It heads east across the Still River and US 7 without a junction along the "Lance Corporal John T. Schmidt Memorial Bridge", heading towards Brookfield Center. At Brookfield Center, it has a junction with Route 25, which leads to the Brookfield Four Corners (the town center) and to Newtown. Past Route 25, it becomes Obtuse Road, passing by Center Elementary School, as it continues for another  to the Housatonic River and Lake Lillinonah. It crosses the Housatonic on the Southville Bridge and enters the town of Bridgewater. In Bridgewater, the road turns north and becomes Main Street South as it proceeds towards the town center. It continues north in Bridgewater as Main Street North for another , until it ends at an intersection with Route 67 north of the town center.

History
In the 1920s, the alignment of modern Route 133 was known as State Highway 182. In 1932, Route 133 was created and used part of old Highway 182 from Federal Road (US 202) to Brookfield Center, then turned north along Whisconier Road (modern Route 25) to end back at Federal Road in Brookfield village. The portion of Old Highway 182 north and east of Brookfield Center was assigned as part of Route 25. In April 1943, the alignments of Routes 25 and 133 in Brookfield were exchanged to conform to traffic patterns, which relocated the northern terminus of Route 133 to Clapboard Road, a former alignment of Route 67. The bridge over the Housatonic River was replaced in 1955 as part of the creation of Lake Lillinonah. In 1959, Route 67 was re-routed from Clapboard Road to its current location and Route 133 extended to meet the new alignment.

Major intersections

References

External links

Transportation in Fairfield County, Connecticut
Transportation in Litchfield County, Connecticut
133
Brookfield, Connecticut
Bridgewater, Connecticut